
Coorong may refer to:

Places

Australia

South Australia
(The) Coorong, a coastal lagoon; also, the long beach along the coast
 Camp Coorong, a cultural and weaving centre
Coorong Game Reserve, a former protected area 
Coorong National Park, a protected area 
Coorong Important Bird Area, an important bird area 
Coorong, South Australia, a locality
Coorong District Council, a local government area

Victoria
Lake Coorong, a lake

Other
Coorong mullet, a local common name used in South Australia for the yellow-eyed mullet

See also
Cooronga, a genus of fruit fly
Coorongite, a hydrocarbon material similar to Elaterite
Coorong and Lakes Alexandrina and Albert Wetland, a wetland system
Coorong rufous bristlebird, a bird species found in Australia